I with macron may refer to:

I with macron (Cyrillic) (Ӣ, ӣ) - a Tajik letter
I with macron (Latin) (Ī, ī) - often used to indicate a long i; a Latvian letter